The IIHF World U20 Championship Division II is played every year among the ice hockey teams under the age of 20 who were placed in Division II in the previous year. 

Until 2001 the tournament was known as the C-series.

Results

Pool C

Champions (1983–2000)

References